Diana Gee (born December 21, 1968) is an American table tennis player. She competed at the 1988 Summer Olympics and the 1992 Summer Olympics.

References

External links
 

1968 births
Living people
American female table tennis players
Olympic table tennis players of the United States
Table tennis players at the 1988 Summer Olympics
Table tennis players at the 1992 Summer Olympics
People from Burlingame, California
Sportspeople from California
Pan American Games medalists in table tennis
Pan American Games gold medalists for the United States
Pan American Games silver medalists for the United States
Pan American Games bronze medalists for the United States
Medalists at the 1983 Pan American Games
Medalists at the 1987 Pan American Games
Medalists at the 1991 Pan American Games
Medalists at the 1995 Pan American Games
Table tennis players at the 1983 Pan American Games
Table tennis players at the 1987 Pan American Games
Table tennis players at the 1991 Pan American Games
Table tennis players at the 1995 Pan American Games
21st-century American women